Warp drive is a fictitious spacecraft propulsion system in many science fiction works.

Warp drive or Warp Drive may also refer to:

 Warp Drive, a short street in Sterling, Virginia, US
 Warp Drive Inc, an American manufacturer of composite propellers for ultralight aircraft

See also
 Alcubierre warp drive, a speculative idea for faster-than-light travel 
 Warp (disambiguation)